Brad Maurice Kelley (born 1956) is an American businessman who is the 7th largest landowner in the U.S., with an estimated net worth of US$2.2 billion in 2018. He founded the Commonwealth Brands tobacco company in 1991 and sold the company in 2001 to Houchens Industries for US$1 billion. As of 2014, Kelley's business interests include Calumet Farm, NC2 Media and the Center for Innovation and Technology business park.

Biography

Early life
Kelley was born in Bowling Green, Kentucky.  He was raised in Simpson County, Kentucky, and went to Franklin-Simpson High School in Franklin, Kentucky, where he was a secretary for the Future Farmers of America and was named Kentucky high school conservationist of the year. He bought his first piece of land, a farm near his childhood home, at age 17, and his first warehouse at age 20. He attended Western Kentucky University for a short period but left before the completion of his studies to pursue business interests.

Career
Kelley grew up on a farm that included tobacco, and his early business ventures were a response to changes in the tobacco industry. Because of declining production in the 1980s, many old warehouses in Kentucky stood vacant. He started buying these warehouses, converting them to other uses, and then leasing them out. This interest evolved into manufacturing. In 1991, he founded Commonwealth Brands, a tobacco company that manufactured  low-cost cigarettes, headquartered in Bowling Green, Kentucky. The company was later sold in 2001 to Houchens Industries for US$1 billion. Kelley has never smoked, and he said in 2012, "I've never defended [smoking]. Hopefully it will be phased out of society."

In May 2012, Kelley became the operator of the historic Calumet Farm in Lexington. He was already involved in Thoroughbred breeding and racing operations. He was formerly the largest shareholder and a board member of Churchill Downs. In May 2013, his colt Oxbow won the Preakness Stakes.

Kelley owns 1.7 million acres of American ranching land in Texas, Florida and New Mexico. As of 2012, he is the fourth-largest private land owner in the U.S.

In March 2013, the commercial arm of the BBC, BBC Worldwide, announced the sale of Lonely Planet to Kelly's NC2 Media. Lonely Planet is the world's most successful guidebook publisher, having printed over 100 million guidebooks, in addition to magazines, digital content, and other travel services.

In January 2020, Kelley put up for sale many of his West Texas ranches, offering roughly 500,000 acres with a listing price of $404 million.

In December 2020, NC2 Media sold Lonely Planet to Red Ventures for an undisclosed amount.

Personal life
Kelley is married with three children. He rarely gives interviews and does not use email. Kelley is active in the conservation movement. He supports many environmental and wildlife conservation interests, including Punta Gorda, Florida's Center for Conservation of Tropical Ungulates. The center supports many animal species, including rhinoceros, tapir, wild cattle, and antelope.

References

1956 births
Living people
People from Warren County, Kentucky
People from Nashville, Tennessee
American billionaires
American landowners
American racehorse owners and breeders
Western Kentucky University alumni